Events from the year 1671 in Sweden

Incumbents
 Monarch – Charles XI

Events

 The King grants the nobility Court leet.
 
 

 
 
 
 
 
 
 
 
 The Sami drums is forcibly collected and burned during the ongoing Christianization of the Sami people.

Births

 Gustaf Adlerfelt, historical writer (died 1709) 
 9 July - Margareta von Ascheberg, acting colonel and landowner (died 1753)

Deaths

References

 
Years of the 17th century in Sweden
Sweden